Adam Hill (born 19 October 1986) is a New Zealand Rugby Union player who currently plays as a loose forward for  in the ITM Cup and the  in Super Rugby.

Career

A South Island native, Hill started out his senior career for the Dunedin based  Razorbacks and made 14 appearances for them over the course of 2 years.   He shifted north to join the  Lions for the 2013 ITM Cup and a successful first season in New Zealand's capital saw him named in the  squad for the 2014 Super Rugby season.

Several injuries to other Hurricanes loose forwards led to Hill being named in the first-team squad for the two-match tour of South Africa which kicked off the 'Canes campaign. Hill's Super Rugby career got off to the worst-possible start as he was yellow-carded one minute after coming on to the field as a replacement.

References

1986 births
Living people
New Zealand rugby union players
Rugby union flankers
Otago rugby union players
Wellington rugby union players
Hurricanes (rugby union) players
People from Gore, New Zealand
Rugby union players from Southland, New Zealand